Boothby is a surname. Notable people with the surname include:

Basil Boothby (1910–1990), British diplomat
Benjamin Boothby (1803–1868), judge of the Supreme Court of South Australia
Sir Brooke Boothby, 6th Baronet (1744–1824), British poet and friend of Jean-Jacques Rousseau
Sir Brooke Boothby, 10th Baronet (1856–1913), British diplomat
David Boothby (born 1944), Canadian Police Chief
Dora Boothby (1881–1970), English tennis player
Frances Boothby (fl. 1669–1670), English playwright
Frederic E. Boothby (1845–1923), American railroad manager and politician
Guy Boothby (1867–1905), Australian-born author of the Dr. Nikola novels
Ian Boothby, comic book writer, comedian
Josiah Boothby (1837–1916), Australian public administrator
Neil Boothby, child psychologist
Robert Boothby, Baron Boothby (1900–1986), British politician
Robert Tuite Boothby (1871–1941), British banker, father of Robert Boothby
Scott Boothby (born 1973), American hammer thrower
Thomas Boothby of Tooley, founder of the Quorn Hunt in Leicestershire, England
Thomas Wilde Boothby (1839–1885), aka T. Wilde Boothby, a politician in South Australia
Valerie Boothby (1906–1982), German actress
William Boothby (1829–1903), the Returning Officer for the first Australian federal election, after whom the Division of Boothby was named
William "Cocktail" Boothby (1862–1930), bartender, mixologist, author of The World's Drinks And How To Mix Them
William M. Boothby (1918–2021), American mathematician

English-language surnames